Minjilang, formerly Mission Bay, is the Aboriginal community located on Croker Island, some  east northeast of Northern Territory's capital of Darwin. It is the only settlement of any size on Croker Island, which lies a few kilometres off the mainland.

History

Croker Island Mission existed at Minjilang between 1940 and 1968, operated by the Methodist Overseas Mission.

Geography

The community of Minjilang is on the opposite, eastern side of the island on Mission Bay, a secluded bay. Besides Minjilang, there are only eight small family outstations.

Population
At the 2011 census, Minjilang had a population of 308 primarily Aboriginal people. About 150 speak Iwaidja and are the only speakers of this language, but English, Kunwinjku and Maung are also spoken. Approximately 48% of the population is unemployed.

Croker Island offered a safe haven to many children from the "Stolen Generation", the people who were affected by the policy of forceful removal of Indigenous children from their families. Croker is a so-called dry community, meaning no alcohol may be brought into the village, to prevent abuse. However, the controlled sale of kava is licensed.

Climate 
Minjilang has a tropical savannah climate (Aw) with oppressively hot weather year round. The rainy season typically run from December through April and is very rainy.

Services
Minjilang has a supermarket, school, clinic serviced by a nurse and health worker (a doctor visits each fortnight and the dentist comes periodically). West Arnhem Region provides a number of services, e.g. waste collection, power and water supply and sewerage, and maintenance of roads, the barge landing and community airstrip.

Communications
Croker Island Airfield is located about 11 km west of Minjilang and immediately south of Adjamarrago, a small family outstation. An air service to Darwin is run on a daily basis (except Thursdays and Sundays) by Murin Airways. The haul to Darwin takes about an hour. The community barge service to Darwin by Perkins Shipping is a weekly affair. The island itself has only low-grade dirt roads. A permit from  the Northern Land Council is needed for any visitors wishing to come to Croker Island, as it is restricted Aboriginal-owned land. The community receives one radio station as well as four television stations.

References

External links
 Minjilang Community Profile from Minjilang Community Inc.

Towns in the Northern Territory
Aboriginal communities in the Northern Territory